Dashdendev Makhashiri (born 13 January 1969) is a retired Mongolian athlete who specialised in the discus throw. He represented his country at the 1996 Summer Olympics, as well as three consecutive World Championships starting in 1993.

Competition record

Personal bests
Shot put – 17.80 (Irkutsk 1998) NR
Discus throw – 60.14 (Busan 1997) NR
Hammer throw – 49.97 (Ulan Bator 2005) NR

References

External links
 

1969 births
Living people
Mongolian discus throwers
Athletes (track and field) at the 1994 Asian Games
Athletes (track and field) at the 1998 Asian Games
Olympic athletes of Mongolia
Athletes (track and field) at the 1996 Summer Olympics
Male discus throwers
Mongolian male athletes
Asian Games competitors for Mongolia
Male shot putters
Male hammer throwers
World Athletics Championships athletes for Mongolia
Mongolian hammer throwers